Valmala may refer to:

 Valmala, Italy, a former comune (municipality) in the Province of Cuneo in the Italian region Piedmont
 Valmala, Province of Burgos, a municipality located in Castile and León, Spain.